The black-winged lory (Eos cyanogenia) also known as Biak red lory is a medium-sized, about  long, long-tailed lory. It has a bright red plumage, black shoulder, red iris, an orange red bill and violet ear-patch behind eye. The underwings are red, becoming yellowish with black tips. Both sexes are similar.

An Indonesian endemic, the black-winged lory is distributed to forests and coastal habitat of Biak, Numfoor, and Mios Num islands in Cenderawasih Bay, Papua. It frequents and roosts in coconut trees.

Due to ongoing habitat loss, small population size and hunting in some areas, the black-winged lory is evaluated as near threatened on IUCN Red List of Threatened Species. It is listed on Appendix II of CITES.

References

External links
CITES project proposal (Project S-99/01-P)

black-winged lory
Birds of the Schouten Islands
black-winged lory
black-winged lory
Endemic fauna of the Biak–Numfoor rain forests